Randall Svane is an American composer, born in 1955. His works have been played by the New York Philharmonic, Cincinnati Chamber Orchestra, the Borromeo String Quartet, the Colonial Symphony, Schola Cantorum on Hudson,
 and in the Musikfest at Gut Bötersheim. A CD of his music, played by cellist Richard Locker was released in 2005.

See also
Mass 2005

References

http://www.mka.org/page.cfm?p=12&viewdirid=2626&showFilter=1&keyword=svane

American male composers
21st-century American composers
1955 births
Living people
21st-century American male musicians